The Men's 10m Air Pistol SH1 shooting event at the 2004 Summer Paralympics was competed  on 18 September. It was won by Li Jian Fei, representing .

Preliminary

18 Sept. 2004, 11:45

Final round

18 Sept. 2004, 15:15

References

M